The Grand Hotel Kronenhof is an historic five-star Belle Epoque-era Grand Hotel in Pontresina, Switzerland.

For over 140 years, the hotel was owned by its founding family, the Gredigs.

History

In 1848, Andreas Gredig (1806–1877) acquired the Gasthaus Rössli for his son Lorenz Gredig (1829–1905). The guesthouse business included a wine shop.  Lorenz Gredig initially named the business "Gasthaus zur Krone-Post", but later changed the name to "Krone".  Over time, by constructing additions and incorporating existing outbuildings, he also steadily enlarged the guesthouse and transformed it into a hotel.

Between 1896 and 1898, the architects  expanded the hotel into a representative, horseshoe-shaped three-winged structure.  Since then, it has had a Cour d'honneur (three sided courtyard) dominated by a crowned dome, which still surmounts the main entrance of the hotel and its neo-baroque-style light-bathed entrance hall.

At the time of the expansion, the hotel's name was changed to "Grand Hotel Kronenhof und Bellavista", from which its present name, "Grand Hotel Kronenhof", was later derived.

The outbreak of World War I in 1914 put an abrupt end to further expansion plans. The war and crisis years impacted the hotel's profitability, but its survival was secured by the wine shop, which was still trading, and agriculture.

In 1989, the heirs of the founding Gredig family sold the hotel to two Swiss private investors. In 2004, the two investors, in turn, sold it to the "Grand Hotels Engadinerkulm" company, which also owns the historic "Hotel Kulm" in St. Moritz.  Extensive renovation work was begun that year, but the hotel's original Belle Epoque exterior and interior have both been largely preserved.

Heinz E. and Jenny Hunkeler take over the leadership of the Kronenhof in October 2006. In September 2006 have started the gigantic construction works, including a 100 spaces new underground garage, 28 additional guest rooms and a more than 2000qm large spa-complex. From April 2007 until November 2007 the hotel was completely closed. In addition took place the reconstruction of the staff- accommodation and the kitchen. Since the creation of the three-wing-layout of the hotel in the last century, no project to expand was as big and significant as this.

Marc Eichenberger took over the management of the Grand Hotel Kronenhof in 2013 and in 2014, the hotel was named as the best hotel in the world in TripAdvisor's annual Travellers' Choice Awards. In 2015 he initialises the extension and modernisation of the ski room. 13 double rooms and junior suites are being refurbished in 2016 with French star architect Pierre-Yves Rochon.

References

Notes

Bibliography

External links

Grand Hotel Kronenhof – official site

Hotels in Switzerland
Buildings and structures in Graubünden
Cultural property of national significance in Graubünden

Beaux-Arts architecture
Neoclassical architecture in Switzerland
Belle Époque